Habayia is an extinct genus of traversodontid cynodonts from the Late Triassic of Belgium. A single postcanine tooth was found in Habay-la-Vieille in southern Belgium. Based on the size of the tooth, Habayia was very small. Habayia lived during the Rhaetian stage of the Late Triassic at a time when western Europe was an island archipelago due to high sea levels. The small size of Habayia may be a result of insular dwarfism.

References

Traversodontids
Prehistoric cynodont genera
Habay
Rhaetian genera
Late Triassic synapsids of Europe
Fossils of Belgium
Fossil taxa described in 1999
Taxa named by Pascal Godefroit